Pinnacle is an unincorporated community and census-designated place in southwestern Stokes County, North Carolina, United States, approximately  SSE of the town of Pilot Mountain, between  Pilot Mountain State Park and Hanging Rock State Park. As of March 2015, the exact population is 855.

Demographics

History
The town was originally known as Culler, named for Emanuel W. Culler who owned the land on which a railroad station was built and served as the town's first mayor. The present name was adopted in 1894. Pinnacle was incorporated in 1901 but the charter was repealed in 1903.

Martin served in the North Carolina House of Representatives and as presiding judge of Stoke County court for over 30 years. The house was built by slaves using local flint stones, with a fireplace large enough to roast an ox and stuccoed white plaster on the exterior, and was used as a blockhouse by early settlers. Colonel Martin, who was born in Essex County, Virginia and became a fierce fighter for the Continental cause during the Revolutionary War. Targeted by Tories during and following the War, when he was badly wounded while spying for American forces on the eve of the Battle of Kings Mountain, Martin was the brother of militia General Joseph Martin, namesake of Martinsville, Virginia. Col. Jack Martin saw action at the battles of Chestnut Ridge, Surrey County, Colsons, Old Fields, Alamance and Guilford Courthouse. The Rock House served as the mustering ground for colonial forces during the Revolutionary War as well as the War of 1812. One of the oldest structures in Stokes County and listed on the National Register of Historic Places in 1975, the house burned in 1890, and only the great rock walls remain. Rock House was acquired in 1975 by the Stokes County Historical Society, which has struggled recently to protect the ruins from vandals.

In addition to the Rock House, the Hauser Farm was listed on the National Register of Historic Places in 2002.

References

External links
 Atlantic & Yadkin Railway

Census-designated places in North Carolina
Census-designated places in Stanly County, North Carolina
Populated places established in 1894